The Hamley Bridge-Gladstone railway line was a railway line on the South Australian Railways network. It extended from a junction at Hamley Bridge on the Roseworthy-Peterborough line (which provided connection through to Adelaide) through Balaklava and Brinkworth to Gladstone.

History
The earliest part of the narrow gauge Hamley Bridge-Gladstone line opened from Balaklava to Blyth on 14 March 1876 as part of the Port Wakefield line. On 15 January 1880, the line opened from Hamley Bridge to Balaklava. It was extended north from Blyth to Gladstone on 2 July 1894 where it joined the Port Pirie-Cockburn and Wilmington lines. The line from Gulnare to Gladstone closed on 11 May 1988, followed by the Balaklava to Gulnare section on 29 March 1989. The section track between Balaklava and Gladstone was removed in late 1989, and the 10 km section between Halbury and Balaklava has now been converted into the Shamus Liptrot Cycling Trail.

As Balaklava railway station was originally on the Port Wakefield to Blyth line, before the railway from Hamley Bridge was built, and the new line entered the town from the south-east, trains using the route between Gladstone and Adelaide needed to change direction at Balaklava, as both the north and south lines entered the station from the east, with Port Wakefield being to the west.

The "Western System" included the railway from Hamley Bridge to Gladstone, along with the lines from Balaklava through Port Wakefield, Kadina and Wallaroo, and the line from Kadina through Snowtown to Brinkworth. All of these lines were prepared for conversion from narrow to broad gauge in the mid-1920s, with the switch made on 1 August 1927.

References

External links
Gallery

Closed railway lines in South Australia
Railway lines opened in 1880
Railway lines closed in 1989